The Boys' Doubles tournament of the 2015 BWF World Junior Championships is held on November 10–15. The defending champion of the last edition is Kittinupong Ketlen / Dechapol Puavaranukroh from Thailand.

Seeded

  He Jiting / Zheng Siwei (Champion)
  Joel Eipe / Frederik Sogaard Mortensen (Final)
  Kenya Mitsuhashi / Yuta Watanabe (Semifinals)
  Yahya Adi Kumara / Yantoni Edy Saputra (4th round)
  Andika Ramadiansyah / Rinov Rivaldy (2nd round)
  Gregor Dunikowski / Toma Junior Popov (4th round)
  Po Li-wei / Yang Ming-tse (Quarterfinals)
  Lee Hong-sub / Lim Su-min (Quarterfinals)
  Bjarne Geiss / Jan Colin Völker (3rd round)
  Matthew Clare / Ben Lane (3rd round)
  Goh Sze Fei / Tan Jinn Hwa (4th round)
  Mek Narongrit / Krit Tantianankul (Quarterfinals)
  Miha Ivanic / Andraz Krapez (4th round)
  Ömer Altinkopru / Fethican Degirmenci (3rd round)
  Han Chengkai / Zhou Haodong (Semifinals)
  Thomas Baures / Thom Gicquel (2nd round)

Draw

Finals

Top Half

Section 1

Section 2

Section 3

Section 4

Bottom Half

Section 5

Section 6

Section 7

Section 8

References

Main Draw

2015 BWF World Junior Championships
2015 in youth sport